Robert Jonsson (6 December 1886 – 20 May 1921) was a Swedish sports shooter. He competed in three events at the 1912 Summer Olympics.

References

1886 births
1921 deaths
Swedish male sport shooters
Olympic shooters of Sweden
Shooters at the 1912 Summer Olympics
Sport shooters from Stockholm